There are a number of student organizations at Colby College, ranging from student-run government to a cappella groups and more.

Student Government Association

Students established the Student Government Association (SGA) to "enhance the student community."  The SGA is headed by an elected president, and includes class presidents, dorm representatives, a finance chair, and a publicity chair and other positions.  The SGA has representation on the Colby College Board of Trustees and every all-college committee; additionally, the SGA represents the official student body to the Faculty operated College Affairs Council and President's Council.

The SGA distributes funding to all student operated clubs and organizations on campus.  The Pugh Community Board (PCB) and the Student Planning Board (SPB) are the largest organizations that plan lectures, concerts, and other major student events.

Student Programming Board

In 2003 the college created a Student Programming Board (SPB) to produce social events on campus. This student-run organization sponsors multiple programs every week ranging from dances to special lectures to bingo nights to large-scale live performances. In the past, SPB has brought such acts as Kesha, Krewella, Misterwives, Grouplove, Dropkick Murphys, Wiz Khalifa, Jurassic 5, Citizen Cope, Blackalicious, Ben Folds, Ben Kweller, OK Go, Dane Cook, Talib Kweli, Matisyahu, State Radio, Lupe Fiasco, Blue Scholars, Guster, Common, Mates of State, CAKE, Bob Marley (comedian), LL Cool J, Naughty By Nature, and Macklemore & Ryan Lewis. In addition to SPBs programming, clubs on campus often put on all-school events.

Colby Outing Club

The Colby Outing Club is the largest club on campus with over 300 members annually and a mailing list of over 1,000 people.  The club runs regular trips and maintains an inventory of outdoor equipment open to all Colby students, faculty, and staff who are members. It also owns and operates a cabin on the shore of Great Pond of Belgrade Lakes which is available for day use and overnight rental.

Publications

The Colby Echo

Colby's student newspaper, The Colby Echo, has been published since 1877.  It was published monthly from 1877 to 1886, semi-monthly until 1898, and then weekly from 1898 on.  Staff currently consists of 20 editors, who are responsible for assigning and writing articles, overseeing the production process and maintaining the Echo’s online presence. The Colby Echo editors also assign weekly articles to a team of 15 news staff writers.  The Colby Echo is published every Wednesday that the college is in session, with 1,300 copies printed each week.

WMHB
WMHB 89.7 FM, is Colby's non-commercial College radio station, directed, managed, and staffed entirely by students.  It has been on air since March 1949, and broadcasts new and diverse programming to Waterville, Winslow, Oakland, Fairfield and surrounding communities, and around the world on the Internet via its webcast.

Sigma Kappa
Sigma Kappa (ΣΚ) is a sorority founded in 1874 at Colby College by five women: Mary Caffrey Low Carver, Elizabeth Gorham Hoag, Ida Mabel Fuller Pierce, Frances Elliott Mann Hall and Louise Helen Coburn.  The sorority ceased to exist on Colby's campus in 1984 when the college changed its rules to disallow Greek life, citing a negative effect on the campus.  Since its founding in 1874, the sorority has initiated more than 156,000 members worldwide and has 112 collegiate chapters in 36 states and over 120 alumnae chapters.

References

External links 

Colby College